The following is a list of recurring Saturday Night Live characters and sketches introduced between October 13, 1979, and May 24, 1980, the fifth season of SNL.

Tom Clay
A Harry Shearer sketch. Debuted October 20, 1979.

The Bel-Airabs
The Bel-Airabs was a sketch from the 1979–1980 season. It was a spoof of The Beverly Hillbillies, instead featuring paranoid Arabs. Only two sketches appeared, on December 8, 1979 (host: Howard Hesseman) and February 9, 1980 (host: Chevy Chase). As all of the cast members left the show at the end of that season, it was not continued.

It appears to have been an offshoot of Gilda Radner's "Granny" character, which had appeared in a sketch called "The Shah's Final Days" during the previous season.

Cast
Abdul Asad - Don Novello
Fatima Asad - Laraine Newman
Mudhad Asad - Bill Murray
Granny - Gilda Radner
Miss Hathaway - Jane Curtin

Big Vic Ricker
Ricker, portrayed by Harry Shearer, succeeded Chico Escuela as Weekend Update's sports commentator.  He was prone to speaking very fast and in a gruff voice. Debuted January 26, 1980.

Iris De Flaminio
A Jane Curtin sketch. Debuted April 5, 1980.

Lists of recurring Saturday Night Live characters and sketches
Saturday Night Live in the 1970s
Saturday Night Live
Saturday Night Live
Saturday Night Live in the 1980s